Odeio o Dia dos Namorados is a Brazilian romantic comedy film, directed by Roberto Santucci, written by Paulo Cursino and starring Heloísa Périssé, Daniel Boaventura and Danielle Winits. The film was released on June 7, 2013.

Plot 
Deborah was waived by Hector humiliatingly after certain disagreements. Soon after she puts priority to his work in advertising, where one week next Valentine's Day comes a job offer after accepting she discovers her client is Hector. In this situation, she still has to deal with the unexpected visit of the ghost of a friend Gilberto, who tries to get her to rethink life and discover what people really think of her.

Cast 
 Heloísa Périssé as Débora
 Daniel Boaventura as Heitor
 Danielle Winits
 Marcelo Saback
 MV Bill como Tonhão
 Tony Tornado
 Fernando Caruso
 Daniele Valente

2013 romantic comedy films
2013 films
Brazilian romantic comedy films
Films directed by Roberto Santucci
2010s Portuguese-language films